La fuga is a 1937 Argentine drama film directed by Luis Saslavsky and starring Santiago Arrieta.

In a survey of the 100 greatest films of Argentine cinema carried out by the Museo del Cine Pablo Ducrós Hicken in 2000, the film reached the 32nd position.

Cast
 Santiago Arrieta as Daniel
 Tita Merello as Cora
 Francisco Petrone as Robles
 Niní Gambier as Rosita
 María Santos as María Luisa
 Homero Cárpena as Don Onofrio
 Augusto Codecá as Sr. Pallejac
 Sebastián Chiola as Puentecito
 Amelia Bence as Sara

References

External links
 

1937 films
1937 drama films
Argentine drama films
1930s Spanish-language films
Argentine black-and-white films
Films directed by Luis Saslavsky
1930s Argentine films